Kendal railway station is a railway station serving the market town of Kendal in Cumbria, England. The station is owned by Network Rail and is operated by Northern Trains who provide all passenger train services.

History

The station opened on 28 September 1846 as the temporary terminus of the Lancaster and Carlisle Railway. Through trains operated from 20 April 1847 when the Kendal and Windermere Railway opened its line to Windermere.

The second platform at the station was taken out of use when the line was singled in May 1973. A car park now occupies the site of the demolished Oxenholme-bound platform, signal box and goods depot. The former station building survives but no longer forms part of the station itself (now in private commercial use).

Description

It is on the Windermere Branch Line from Oxenholme to Windermere. It is operated by Northern. It only has one platform, which has a stone-built shelter.  The station is unstaffed: passengers must buy tickets in advance or from the conductor on board the train.  Train running information is provided via digital CIS displays, a customer help point and timetable posters.  Step-free access is available from the car park and main entrance to the platform.

Passengers for most other destinations must change at Oxenholme.

Services are operated with Class 195 diesel multiple units.

References

External links

 Video footage and history of Kendal Station

Railway stations in Cumbria
DfT Category F1 stations
Former London and North Western Railway stations
Railway stations in Great Britain opened in 1846
Northern franchise railway stations
Kendal
1846 establishments in England